Brothers is an American sitcom television series which ran on Fox from September 25, 2009 to December 27, 2009. It originally aired on Friday nights at 8:00 pm ET before moving to Sunday nights at 7:00 pm ET as part of the 2009 fall schedule.

Premise 
The series stars former NFL star Michael Strahan and Daryl "Chill" Mitchell as estranged brothers who are pressured to get along by their parents (played by Carl Weathers and C. C. H. Pounder) after Strahan's character moves back to his home town of Houston. Strahan's character is retired from the NFL, while Mitchell's character, a paraplegic using a wheelchair after a car wreck, runs a restaurant.

Cast 
 Michael Strahan as Michael "Mike" Trainor
 Daryl Mitchell as Chill Trainor
 CCH Pounder as Adele Trainor
 Carl Weathers as Coach Trainor

Episodes

Reception 
The pilot received, according to Metacritic, mixed or average reviews. Ratings for the show's debut were disappointing and did not improve much over the course of its 13-episode run.  Fox declined to order any more episodes for the remainder of the 2009-2010 TV season and later confirmed that the show had been canceled.

Ratings

Sunday repeats

References

External links

2009 American television series debuts
2009 American television series endings
2000s American black sitcoms
English-language television shows
Fox Broadcasting Company original programming
Television series about brothers
Television series by Sony Pictures Television
Television series created by Don Reo
Television shows set in Houston